James Pepper may refer to:

 Jim Pepper (1941–1992), Kaw Nation and American jazz saxophonist, composer, and singer
 James Auburn Pepper (1915–1985), farmer and political figure in Saskatchewan
 James Pepper, cowboy involved in New Mexico's Lincoln County War as an ally of John Chisum
 James E. Pepper, American whiskey brand